Tim Merritt (born June 28, 1982 in Gig Harbor, Washington) is an American soccer player who currently plays for USASA amateur team CASL Elite.

Career

High school and college
Merritt attended Bellarmine Preparatory School and played college soccer at the University of North Carolina from 2001 to 2004.  Merritt was a two-time second-team All-ACC selection at defender for Carolina and was a member of the Tar Heels’ 2001 NCAA Championship team.  He scored 10 goals and had 11 assists for 31 points over his collegiate career.

During his college years he also played with Carolina Dynamo in the USL Premier Development League, and was named to the PDL All-Central Conference team in 2004.

Professional
Merritt was drafted in the fourth round (48th overall) 2005 MLS SuperDraft by D.C. United.  Merritt made only one appearance with United's regular squad but was a strong contributor to the reserve team's inaugural MLS Reserve Division championship in 2005.

Merritt spent the next two years playing abroad in Germany with FSV Oggersheim.  At FSV Oggersheim, Merritt helped the club win promotion to the Regionalliga Süd in 2007.  In his two years with the club, he compiled 40 appearances while tallying 1 goal and 6 assists.

After suffering a knee injury while playing in Germany, Merritt returned to the United States in 2008. While recovering, he played with the amateur Seattle Wolves in the South Puget Sound League, and having trialed with the San Jose Earthquakes during pre-season, Merritt signed with Miami FC in 2009. He went on to play 24 games and score one goal for Miami before choosing to retire from professional soccer and pursue other career opportunities at the end of the season.

References

External links
 Miami FC bio
 Carolina bio

1982 births
Living people
North Carolina Fusion U23 players
D.C. United players
Miami FC (2006) players
USL League Two players
USL First Division players
North Carolina Tar Heels men's soccer players
American soccer players
American expatriate soccer players
American expatriate soccer players in Germany
FSV Oggersheim players
Colorado Rapids U-23 players
Soccer players from Washington (state)
D.C. United draft picks
People from Gig Harbor, Washington
Association football defenders